Långsjön ("long lake") may refer to the following lakes in Sweden:

 Långsjön, Älvsjö, on the border between Stockholm and Huddinge Municipalities
 Långsjön, Hanveden, on the border between Huddinge and Haninge Municipalities
 Långsjön (Skälsätra-Tutviken), on the border between Haninge and Tyresö Municipalities
 Långsjön, Tyresta, in Tyresö Municipality

See also
 Langsjøen, a lake in Norway